Curtis S. Bowley (born August 10, 1954) is a former Democratic member of the Pennsylvania House of Representatives.

References

Democratic Party members of the Pennsylvania House of Representatives
Living people
1954 births
People from Warren, Pennsylvania